Vicki A. Romero High School was a public charter high school in Phoenix, Arizona. It operated from 1998 until 2012, when renewal of its charter was declined.  The site is now home to Wilson College Prep (opened 2017) of the Phoenix Union High School District.

References

Public high schools in Arizona
High schools in Phoenix, Arizona
Charter schools in Arizona
Former high schools in Arizona